Khandhar (English: Ruins) is a 1984 Indian Hindi-language film directed by Mrinal Sen, based on a Bengali short story, Telenapota Abishkar (Discovering Telenapota) by Premendra Mitra. The film stars Shabana Azmi, Naseeruddin Shah and Pankaj Kapur. It was screened in the Un Certain Regard section at the 1984 Cannes Film Festival.

Plot 
Three friends from the city visit some ruins where an aged mother (Gita Sen) and her daughter Jamini (Shabana Azmi) live. Mother awaits the arrival of a distant cousin to marry Jamini, but the man is already married and living in Calcutta. The photographer Subhash (Naseeruddin Shah) takes pity on the family and pretends to be the awaited suitor. They keep up the charade for the duration of the trio's visit, Subhash quietly becoming attracted to Jamini even as he understands the fate awaiting her. When the friends leave, Jamini stays behind, facing a life of loneliness in the ruins.

Cast 
 Shabana Azmi as Jamini
 Naseeruddin Shah as Subhash
  Gita Sen as The Mother
 Pankaj Kapur as Dipu
 Annu Kapoor as Anil
 Sreela Majumdar as Gauri
 Rajen Tarafder as Harihar (voice over by Om Puri)

Awards 
 1985: Chicago International Film Festival: Grand Prize (Best Film)
 1985 Filmfare Best Screenplay Award: Mrinal Sen
 1984 National Film Award for Best Director: Mrinal Sen
 1984 National Film Award for Best Actress: Shabana Azmi
 1984 National Film Award for Best Editing : Mrinmoy Chakraborty

Restoration 
Ujwal Nirgudkar received Assocham Award for Best Film Restoration of Khandhar.

References

External links

1984 films
1980s Hindi-language films
Films directed by Mrinal Sen
Films featuring a Best Actress National Award-winning performance
Films based on short fiction
Films whose director won the Best Director National Film Award
Films whose editor won the Best Film Editing National Award